Bryobilimbia is a genus of lichen-forming fungi belonging to the family Lecideaceae. It was circumscribed in 2014 by Alan Fryday, Christian Printzen, and Stefan Ekman. The type species is Bryolimbia hypnorum.

Species

Bryobilimbia ahlesii 
Bryobilimbia australis 
Bryobilimbia austrosaxicola 
Bryobilimbia diapensiae 
Bryobilimbia fissuriseda 
Bryobilimbia flakusii 
Bryobilimbia hypnorum 
Bryobilimbia pallida 
Bryobilimbia sanguineoatra

References

Lecideales
Lichen genera
Lecideales genera
Taxa described in 2014